is a junction passenger railway station of the West Japan Railway Company (JR-West) located in the city of Iga, Mie, Japan.

Lines
Tsuge Station is served by the Kansai Main Line and is located 79.9 rail kilometers from the terminus of the line at Nagoya Station and 20.0 rail kilometers from Kameyama Station. It is also  terminus of the and Kusatsu Line  and is 36.7 rail kilometers from the opposing terminus of that line at Kusatsu Station.

Layout
The station consists of a side platform and an island platform with three tracks on the ground level, connected by a footbridge.

Platforms

History
Tsuge Station was opened on February 18, 1890 with the extension of the Kansai Railway from Mikumo Station, making it the oldest station within Mie Prefecture. The Kansai Railway was extended to Yokkaichi Station on December 25, 1890 and to Ueno Station on January 15, 1897. The line was nationalized on October 1, 1907, becoming part of the Imperial Government Railways (IGR), which became Japan National Railways (JNR) after World War II. Freight operations were discontinued from August 1, 1972. With the privatization of JNR on April 1, 1987, the station came under the control of JR-West.

Passenger statistics
In fiscal 2019, the station was used by an average of 308 passengers daily (boarding passengers only).

Surrounding area
The old Iga Kaido highway and its post town remain to the south of the station, but no urban area around the station itself.

See also
 List of railway stations in Japan

References

External links

  

Railway stations in Japan opened in 1890
Railway stations in Mie Prefecture
Iga, Mie